The KME Group is one of the world's largest copper producers.  It was formed from the merging of several copper producers: Kabelmetal AG in Osnabrück (formerly called OKD - Osnabrücker Kupfer und Drahtwerke), Stolberger Metallwerke, Tréfimétaux SA in France, and Europa Metalli.

The Group is under the majority ownership of the SMI (Societa Metallurgica Italiana).

External links
 Official website
 

Copper
Metal companies of Italy
Osnabrück